Emily Halpern is an American film and television screenwriter. She is best known for co-writing the screenplay of Booksmart and was nominated for Best Original Screenplay at the British Academy of Film and Television Arts in 2020.

Life and career
Emily was born in Massachusetts, and graduated from Harvard College. She began her career writing for the CBS television series The Unit and the ABC television series Private Practice. In 2019, she co-wrote the screenplay for her debut feature film Booksmart, along with Sarah Haskins. Most recently, she co-wrote the film 80 for Brady, along with Sarah Haskins.

Filmography

Awards and nominations

References

External links
 

Living people
American women screenwriters
20th-century American writers
20th-century American women writers
21st-century American writers
21st-century American women writers
Harvard College alumni
Year of birth missing (living people)